The Naked Brothers Band is a soundtrack album by Nat and Alex Wolff for Season 1 of The Naked Brothers Band  television series. The album was also released as a deluxe fanpack that includes a poster, lyrics and 2 bonus tracks.

Background

Development
Nickelodeon saw The Naked Brothers Band: The Movie at the Hamptons International Film Festival, in late 2005. They picked the show up in 2006. Polly Draper asked her boys to record all the music for the series as an album.

Writing
After being asked to record an album, the brothers began writing several songs for the show. The songs had a pop style, directed more for younger viewers. Alex was only able to write two songs for the series, due to being 8 at the time.

Release
The album released on October 7, 2007, and debuted at #23 on the Billboard 200.

Track listings

Personnel
 Bob Glaub - bass
 Jennifer Condos - bass
 Erik Friedlander - cello
 Alex Wolff - drums, vocals
 John Guth - guitar
 Craig Stull - guitar
 Peter Maunu - guitar
 Nat Wolff - guitar, piano, vocals
 Matt Laug - percussion, drums
 Michael Wolff - accordion, keyboards

International release
The album was released internationally, unlike their following album I Don't Want to Go to School. The album was released in England, Australia, Canada, Brazil and New Zealand.

Follow-up
Due to the Success of the first season of the show, it was commissioned for a second season. Season 2 aired in 2008 and an album was released which featured the music, I Don't Want to Go to School. The album was released in the United States alone on April 15, 2008.

Critical reception

The album received generally mixed reviews, Allmusic gave the album a 3 star rating  while other sites said the album was aimed at younger children, due to its bubblegum pop style and catchy lyrics. Sony Music gave the album a favourable 4 star rating, calling it great for kids, but not aimed at adults.

References

External links 
 Visit Website!
 Watch Episodes!

2007 debut albums
2007 soundtrack albums
Television soundtracks
Pop rock soundtracks
Columbia Records soundtracks